Group B of the 2005 Fed Cup Europe/Africa Zone Group II was one of two pools in the Europe/Africa Zone Group II of the 2005 Fed Cup. Four teams competed in a round robin competition, with the top two teams and the bottom two teams proceeding to their respective sections of the play-offs: the top teams play for advancement to Group I, while the bottom teams face potential relegation to Group III.

Ireland vs. Norway

Latvia vs. Georgia

Ireland vs. Georgia

Latvia vs. Norway

Ireland vs. Latvia

Georgia vs. Norway

See also
Fed Cup structure

References

External links
Fed Cup website

2005 Fed Cup Europe/Africa Zone